Surendra Nath Jena (10 October 1924 – 8 October 2007) created an entirely new Odissi dance style with an oeuvre of many compositions. This dance style incorporates the various aspects of Indian culture, such as temple sculpture, ancient dance, Sanskrit and vernacular literature, yoga, traditional painting, manuscripts, and philosophy. The entire music and dance choreography of these compositions were by Jena himself.

Early life

Childhood
Surendra Nath Jena lived in the small village of Uchapur in Bhadrak district of Odisha. He belonged to a very poor family of farmers. His father Shri Kalandi Charan Jena died at early age and his mother Smt Gukhuni Devi Jena brought him up by selling vegetables and fish in the local market. His mother belonged to an artist family of local singers and Jatra actors. Due to very less interest in studying in school and being naughty, at the age of seven his mother put him in Asura Matha, a nearby institution where children lived and stayed to learn dance and drama.

Jatra Journey

His Jatra teacher was Anand Nayak. Soon he started giving Jatra performances of stories in the epics of Mahabharat, Puran and Ramayan. For almost thirty years, he traveled all across Odisha in bullock carts or sometimes on foot, along with Jatra Troup and gave night long performances, rehearsing and subsisting on very little money and food.

When the troupe arrived in a village, an area was marked for them, attached to a house or dwelling for them to stay in. They performed at night with bamboo torches lighting the acting and torchbearers would follow the actors, illuminating them as they moved on stage. This created a comic, but fantasy-like atmosphere. The audience would get mesmerized and some would identify so completely with a character that they would go into a trance.

In the 1930s, Odisha was a conglomeration of petty realms and kingdoms and the New Odisha Theatre troupe, was given boarding and lodging by the local raja. In the process, the troupe encountered many kinds of local rajas: many were wise enlightened like the Maharaja of Dassapala, and some embittered and whimsical like the Maharaja of Ranapur.
His Jatra performances was a way of life, entwined with recreating myths of devotion, which left a deep imprint on Jena's mind, and created a rich resource that he draws upon for his Abhinaya compositions in subsequent years.

Expanded description

In his life, Goddess Saraswati influenced him; he had heard of a Sharla Temple in Jhankedeswar near Cuttack. This is a special Goddess Saraswati Temple where artists and scholars would go to seek divine blessings for their arts. He resolved to undertake this pilgrimage. He began to walk to this temple, which was miles away from his own town. three days and nights he was on the road, sleeping under the sky, eating coarse rice. He was putting himself to test- the penance before appealing to Saraswati for her blessings. This divine patron of the arts convinced him of his impending success.

Returning hungry exhausted yet exhilarated, he stumbled upon a stranger, an actor in the Ras Party of Gopinathpur, who offered him a job in the repertory company. A blessing indeed, he was an actor and a teacher earning twenty rupees, which was considered a good salary in rural India in those days. He became the guru of the Jaidurga Dramatic troupe of Chudwara and the Director of Odisha's most popular Jatra troupe, Sharda Kala Kunja of Nagaspur.

Personal life

In his late thirties, he married Smt. Kumudini Jena.

 Nirmal Ch Jena, He established the Odissi Dance Company (ODC) in Sydney, Australia. He presented a series of performances and dance education programs in Sydney, Melbourne, and Canberra. 
 Pratibha Jena Singh, She is one of Odissi's leading exponents. she has created performances, demonstrations and imparted dance education in this unique Odissi style all over the world. She imparts training in the nuances of this legendary Odissi style at the Triveni Kala Sangam, New Delhi and at dance schools in Russia and Ukraine.  
Other two daughters Rekha Yadav in Delhi and Rama Jena Pradhan teach Music and Dance in Bhubneshwar.

Career

Beginning of Dance

Guru Surendra Nath Jena spent six months in Kolkata, to learn the art of Kathakali from Bal Krishna Menon. This Kerala dance form was highly sophisticated as compared to Jatra, which is why he decided to learn it. But he could not complete his learning due to lack of money. In the 1950s, Odissi developed a dance form that was rediscovered by Oriya artists, scholars, Gotipua Gurus and Maharis named Jayantika. He spent the first five years studying the style recreated from the testimony of old Devadasis/Mahari dance and gotipuas, or young boys dressed up as women who had replaced the Maharis. With the completion of his study, he received the Nrutya Bhushan degree in Odissi Dance in the year 1965–66.

The Konarak Inspiration

Soon Jena left Odisha and moved to Delhi, where he joined Nritya Niketan in 1966 as an assistant, and later joined Triveni Kala Sangam, an art institution in New Delhi as an independent teacher of Odissi Dance in the year 1967. He spent all his life here, teaching many foreign and Indian students and created his unique style of Odissi until his old age 2004. One day Odisha beckoned and Jena took a trip with one of his foreign students for performance in Bhubneshwar. After the performance, they went to see the famous Konark Sun Temple. This thirteenth-century temple's  carving awed him. They symbolized his interpretation was so intense, it led to the creation of his unique style of Odissi with the first dance Konark Kanti in 1968. The dance imbibed stances and postures from Konark temple and other Odishan Temples, deftly choreographed into dances with music, into an entire style of Odissi, such that the great sculpture was transformed into the real and living.

He has given his special style both qualities of celestial beauty: Lasya and Tandava, which is his essence of Odissi. Bhakti or devotion through dance was his religion and each of his compositions soaked in the feelings for godhead. Radha and Krishna were his Ishta Devata. He upholds the ancient belief that Bhakti finds expression in dance and music and that this is a form of sadhana. His style is a way of worshiping the super soul through dance.

Unique style
In 1966 he came to Delhi and began to develop his own style of Odissi dance. This style is unique, enriched by his deeply researched appreciation of ancient literature and Odisha temple sculpture. His choreography is an inspired essay at bringing alive those poses captured in stone, reminiscent of temple carvings. He gives as much importance to feelings(Bhav), elements in dance, as he does to basic poses(Bhangi), his opinion that one is incomplete without the other. He upholds the ancient belief that Bhakti finds expression in dance and music, that itself is form of Sadhana.

His style is unique and dynamic, spiritual devotional, inspired by the temple sculpture of Odisha. It has evolved from the Similarities between images seen in Odisha's rural culture in everyday life and Odisha's various arts like Jatra, Pattachitra scrolls, Talapatra paintings, Odisha's text, the Exquisite temple of Konark, Lingraj, Jagannath Puri, Chausat Yogini etc. His style brings temple sculpture to life.

Awards and Achievementss
In the 1970s he went to U.S.A three times to teach Odissi in workshops, on the private invitation and from the Naropa Institute of United States.
He received Fellowship from Dept. of Culture, Govt. of India from 1981–82.
He wrote the book 'Atman-Odissi Nritya Puran' in Oriya poetry about the history, technique, and aesthetics of Odissi from 1991–93.
Video documentation of his dance composition was done by Sangeet Natak Akademi in 1994.
The Roehampton University of London made a Documentary Film on Jena's style, titled "Performing Konark, Performing Hirapur" by Dr. Alessandra Lopez y Royo in the year 2005–06.
He received the Sangeet Natak Akademi Award from President of India Abdul Kalam in the year 2007, for his contributions to Odissi.

References/Notes and references

Further reading
 ATMAN- Odissi Nritya Puran by Guru Surendra Nath Jena. Published by Pratibha Jena Singh, 2017. .
 Dance Matters, Ch-17  Guru Surendra Nath Jena Subverting the Reconstituted Odissi Canon. Written by Alessandra Lopez y Royo, 2010..

External links
 
 
other links

Video links

1924 births
2007 deaths
Indian dance teachers
Recipients of the Sangeet Natak Akademi Award
People from Bhadrak district
Odissi exponents
Performers of Indian classical dance
Indian classical choreographers
Dance education in India
Teachers of Indian classical dance
Indian choreographers
20th-century Indian dancers
Dancers from Odisha
20th-century Indian educators
Educators from Odisha